Walnut Township is a township in Polk County, Iowa, United States.

History
Walnut Township was established in 1860.

References

Townships in Polk County, Iowa
Townships in Iowa
1860 establishments in Iowa